Bistrița Bârgăului is a commune in Bistrița-Năsăud County, Transylvania, Romania. It is composed of two villages, Bistrița Bârgăului and Colibița (Kolibica).

The commune is located in the eastern part of the county, on the border with Mureș and Suceava counties. It lies on the banks of the river Bistrița (sometimes referred to as Bistrița ardeleană or Bistricioara), nestled between the Bârgău Mountains to the north and the Călimani Mountains to the south.

National road  (part of European route E58) connects Bistrița Bârgăului to the county seat, Bistrița,  to the west, and to Vatra Dornei,  to the east.

The lake was formed by a hydroelectric dam built between 1977 and 1991.

References

Communes in Bistrița-Năsăud County
Localities in Transylvania